Beresford is an unincorporated community in Gloucester County, New Brunswick, Canada. It held town status prior to 2023.

History
On 1 January 2023, Beresford amalgamated with three villages, seven local service districts (LSDs) and parts of three other LSDs to form the new town of Belle-Baie. The community's name remains in official use.

Geography 
It is on the shore of Nepisiguit Bay, part of Chaleur Bay immediately north of the city of Bathurst.

Demographics

79% of the former town's residents are francophone.

Language

Attractions
One of Beresford's main attractions is its beach. Renovated in the late 1990s, the beach features an observation tower overlooking the marshes, a boardwalk and change room, restroom and shower facilities. A popular tourist attraction, it is not rare to find local musicians featuring their talents at the beach on warm summer nights.

Every year a carnival called "Carnaval du Siffleux" is held in Beresford. Sculptures made of snow collected by ploughing parking lots are presented all around town. This is one of the many activities available to Beresford residents during this carnival.  However, in recent years, fewer sculptures have been seen around the time of the festival.

Notable people

Ray Frenette - Former Premier of New Brunswick.

See also
List of communities in New Brunswick

References

Communities in Gloucester County, New Brunswick
Former towns in New Brunswick
Populated coastal places in Canada